Turian may refer to:

 Turian (Mass Effect), a fictional alien species in the Mass Effect video game franchise
 Turian-Chay State Reserve, in Azerbaijan
 Mike Turian (fl. 1997–2004), American professional Magic: The Gathering player
 Roland Turian (fl. 1948), Swiss Olympic fencer
 Turian, a neologism for gay men, named after Alan Turing

See also
 Tourian (disambiguation)
 Turin (disambiguation)